The name Champion Records has been used by at least four record labels:

 Champion Records (Richmond, Indiana), founded in Richmond, Indiana, and its successor label
 Champion Records (Nashville, Tennessee), a Nashville, Tennessee-based record label
 Champion Records (UK), a British record label
 Champion Records, a United States label distributed by Vee-Jay Records